Nepenthes extincta is a tropical pitcher plant native to the Philippines. It is known only from Surigao del Sur, Mindanao, where it has been recorded at   altitude.

This species belongs to the informal "N. alata group", which also includes N. alata, N. ceciliae, N. copelandii, N. graciliflora, N. hamiguitanensis, N. kitanglad, N. kurata, N. leyte, N. mindanaoensis, N. negros, N. ramos, N. saranganiensis, and N. ultra. These species are united by a number of morphological characters, including winged petioles, lids with basal ridges on the lower surface (often elaborated into appendages), and upper pitchers that are usually broadest near the base.

The specific epithet extincta was chosen to indicate that this species may already be extinct in the wild. Nepenthes extincta is known from a single herbarium specimen collected in 1978.

It has been suggested that the only known specimen of N. extincta might represent a natural hybrid between N. merrilliana and N. mindanaoensis, as both of these species grow near the type locality of N. extincta and share many morphological features with it.

References

 Cheek, M. (2014). 12 new carnivorous plant species from the Philippines. Kew Science Blog, 20 January 2014. 
 Smith, L. (2014). Pitcher perfect - but carnivorous plants are at risk. The Independent, January 5, 2014. 

Carnivorous plants of Asia
extincta
Endemic flora of the Philippines
Flora of Mindanao
Plants described in 2013
Taxa named by Martin Cheek
Taxa named by Matthew Jebb